FLN FRISIA-Luftverkehr GmbH Norddeich, usually shortened to FLN, is a small airline from Germany based in Norden, Lower Saxony, which was founded on 14 June 1969.

Destinations
As of November 2020, FLN operates scheduled flights between Norddeich and Juist, Harle and Wangerooge as well as on-demand charter flights to other East Frisian Islands.

Fleet

As of June 2019, the FLN Frisia Luftverkehr fleet consisted of the following aircraft:

Accidents and incidents
 FLN had to write off two of its Britten-Norman Islander aircraft after crash landings (on 12 January 1979 at Juist and on 18 May 1983 at Schleswig), neither resulting in any fatalities.

References

External links

Official website

Airlines established in 1969
Airlines of Germany
Juist
German companies established in 1969